

Great Britain
 Bombay – William Hornby, Governor of Bombay (1771–1784)
Province of Massachusetts Bay – Thomas Hutchinson, Governor (1769–1774)
 Province of New Jersey – William Franklin, Governor (1763–1776)

Portugal
 Angola – António de Lencastre, Governor of Angola (1772–1779)
 Macau – Diogo Fernandes Salema e Saldanha, Governor of Macau (1771–1777)

Spain
New Spain – Antonio María de Bucareli y Ursúa, Viceroy of New Spain (1771–1779)

Colonial governors
Colonial governors
1773